The Austin Sol is a professional ultimate team from Austin, Texas playing in the South Division of the American Ultimate Disc League. The team was founded in 2016, and played its first match on April 2, 2016. The Sol play their home games at Westlake Chaparral Stadium. The owner and general manager of the Sol is Patrick Christmas, the head coach is Steven Naji, and the assistant general manager is Ryan Purcell.

Seasons

2016

Source:

2017

Source:

2018

 – after a brief rain delay, Tampa was forced to leave, forfeiting the game.

2019

 
Source:

2020 
The 2020 AUDL Season was cancelled due to the COVID-19 pandemic

2021

Roster 

Source:

References

External links 
 

Ultimate teams established in 2015
Ultimate (sport) teams
Sports in Austin, Texas
2015 establishments in Texas